KCUA may refer to:

 KCUA (FM)
 Kyoto City University of Arts